Aleksey Butarevich (born 12 January 1997) is a Belarusian professional footballer who plays for Rotor Volgograd.

References

External links 
 
 

1997 births
Living people
People from Lida
Sportspeople from Grodno Region
Belarusian footballers
Association football midfielders
Belarusian expatriate footballers
Expatriate footballers in Russia
FC Neman Grodno players
FC Smolevichi players
FC Torpedo Minsk players
FC Dinamo Minsk players
FC Slutsk players
FC Rotor Volgograd players